Sun Vandeth ( born 22 August 1997) is a Cambodian footballer who plays for the National Police Commissary in the Cambodian League and also Cambodia national football team. He made his national debut in a 6-0 loss against Syria in the a 2018 World Cup Qualifying match on 24 March 2016. Vandeth also represented the national team during the 2016 Bangabandhu Cup in Bangladesh.

International goals

Scores and results list Cambodia goal tally first.

References

1997 births
Living people
Cambodian footballers
Cambodia international footballers
People from Koh Kong province
Association football forwards
Competitors at the 2017 Southeast Asian Games
Southeast Asian Games competitors for Cambodia